Royston John Hughes, Baron Islwyn, DL (9 June 1925 – 19 December 2003) was a British Labour Party politician from Wales, and a trade union organiser. He served as Member of Parliament (MP) for Newport from 1966 to 1983, and for Newport East from 1983 until his retirement at the 1997 general election. He accepted a life peerage upon his retirement.

Early life
Hughes was born in the Monmouthshire town of Pontllanfraith located in the valley north of his later constituency of Newport and worked as a miner from 1940 until 1943, completing grammar school at Pontllanfraith.  He then enlisted into the British Army and served with the 2nd battalion of the Welch Regiment.

After demobilisation in 1946, Hughes became a Labour Party member and moved to Coventry where he worked as a manager for the Standard Motor Company, where he obtained a degree from Ruskin College, Oxford and became an administrator for Standard Motor from 1957 until 1966. He then became a union leader, working as an officer of the TGWU from 1959 to 1966. He was a councillor on Coventry City Council and secretary of Coventry Labour Party from 1962.

Parliamentary career
At the 1966 general election, he was elected to Parliament and became MP for Newport, replacing former Home Secretary Sir Frank Soskice, winning a large majority of votes. In his maiden speech, he praised the current government for providing pensioners with fuel benefits.

Later, he became known for his pro-union viewpoint, as well as support for what he termed the unalienable rights of the Palestinian people. He claimed that in order to "get a fair picture of Industry, he would read the Morning Star." He also sponsored a bill to protect badgers in 1991, and was an honorary member of several football and cricket teams.

In 1994, he was one of six Labour MPs who voted against any reduction in the age of consent for homosexuals. At the time of the vote in question the age of consent was 21, and the proposal was that it be reduced to 18).

On 25 October 1997 Hughes was created a life peer taking the title Baron Islwyn, of Casnewydd in the County of Gwent.

Personal life
Hughes married Marion Appleyard in 1957 and they had three daughters.

Arms

References

Times Guide to the House of Commons Times Newspapers Limited, 1992
Lord Islwyn of Casnewydd obituary, Andrew Roth, The Guardian, 23 December 2003. Retrieved 15 June 2006.
Lord Islwyn obituary, The Daily Telegraph, 22 December 2003. Retrieved 15 June 2006.

External links 
 

1925 births
2003 deaths
People from Blackwood, Caerphilly
Welsh Labour Party MPs
Politics of Newport, Wales
Alumni of Ruskin College
Transport and General Workers' Union-sponsored MPs
UK MPs 1966–1970
UK MPs 1970–1974
UK MPs 1974
UK MPs 1974–1979
UK MPs 1979–1983
UK MPs 1983–1987
UK MPs 1987–1992
UK MPs 1992–1997
Islwyn, Royston Hughes, Baron
Islwyn
Welsh socialists
Coventry City Councillors
Deputy Lieutenants of Gwent
British Army personnel of World War II
Military personnel from Monmouthshire
Welch Regiment soldiers